Božo Milić (Cyrillic: Божо Милић; born 10 October 1981) is a Montenegrin retired professional footballer.

Playing career
Milić played in the Second League of FR Yugoslavia with Big Bull Bačinci in 2000. The following season he began playing at the First League of FR Yugoslavia with FK Milicionar, FK Zemun, FK Budućnost Podgorica, FK Kom, and FK Borac Čačak. In 2006, he went abroad to Canada to sign with the Serbian White Eagles in the Canadian Soccer League. He made his debut on May 19, 2006, against Italia Shooters. In his debut season he won the International Division and clinched a playoff berth. He featured in the CSL Championship final against Italia, but were defeated by a score of 1–0.

After a season abroad he returned to his homeland to play with OFK Grbalj in the Montenegrin First League. In the 2008-09 season he played with OFK Petrovac, where he won the Montenegrin Cup. In 2009, he signed with league champions FK Mogren, where he played in the 2009–10 UEFA Champions League against Hibernians F.C., and F.C. Copenhagen. He returned to Petrovac, and Grbalj to play one season with both clubs. In 2013, he played in the Montenegrin Second League with FK Jezero. He concluded his career with FK Zeta, and FK Dečić.

Honors
Mogren
Montenegrin Cup (1): 2007–08
Serbian White Eagles
Canadian Soccer League International Division (1): 2006

References 

1981 births
Living people
Footballers from Podgorica
Association football midfielders
Serbia and Montenegro footballers
Montenegrin footballers
FK Milicionar players
FK Zemun players
FK Budućnost Podgorica players
FK Kom players
FK Borac Čačak players
Serbian White Eagles FC players
OFK Grbalj players
OFK Petrovac players
FK Mogren players
FK Jezero players
FK Zeta players
FK Dečić players
Second League of Serbia and Montenegro players
First League of Serbia and Montenegro players
Canadian Soccer League (1998–present) players
Montenegrin First League players
Montenegrin Second League players
Montenegrin expatriate footballers
Expatriate soccer players in Canada
Montenegrin expatriate sportspeople in Canada